Paolo Marinelli (born 10 April 1995 in Rijeka) is a Croatian professional basketball player for Évreux of the French second-tier Pro B league. Standing at 1.91 m, he plays at the point guard position.

Professional career
Marinelli started playing basketball for the youth selection of KK Jadran, before joining Akademija Vujčić in 2011.
He made his senior debut against KK Alkar in A-1 Liga in February 2012, when he played 7 minutes. 
After debut he became regular player for Split, playing in A-1 Liga and Adriatic League.

In August 2013, Marinelli signed four-year contract with Union Olimpija.

In his first season in Ljubljana, Marinelli had minor role in team, playing 9 games in Adriatic League.

After struggling with injuries in Olimpija roster in November 2014 Marinelli get more chance on pitch. On 3 December 2014 he scored career-high 18 points in an 89 - 67 win over Szolnoki Olaj KK (Round 8, Eurocup).

On 11 August 2015 he was loaned to Kvarner 2010 of the Croatian A-1 Liga for the 2015–16 season.

On 7 November 2021, Marinelli signed in Belgium with Belfius Mons-Hainaut of the BNXT League.

In December 2021, Marinelli signed with Évreux of the French second-tier Pro B league.

Personal life
Marinelli is a member of the Italian Community in Dalmatia.

Individual Awards
 2013 FIBA Europe Under-18 Championship: All-Tournament Team

References

External links
 ABA League profile
 Eurobasket.com profile
 FIBA Profile
RealGM Profile

1995 births
Living people
ABA League players
Basketball players from Rijeka
BC Dzūkija players
Croatian men's basketball players
Croatian people of Italian descent
KK Cibona players
KK Krka players
KK Kvarner 2010 players
KK Olimpija players
KK Split players
Point guards
Belfius Mons-Hainaut players
ALM Évreux Basket players
KK Škrljevo players